The Battle of Międzyrzec Podlaski, also known as the Battle of Rogoźnica, was a battle of the November Uprising, fought 29 August 1831, in the area of the villages of Manie, Rogoźnica, and Międzyrzec Podlaski, in Congress Poland. It was fought by the insurgent forces of the Polish National Government, led by Girolamo Ramorino, against the forces of the Russian Empire, led by Georg Andreas von Rosen. It was won by the insurgent forces.

References 

Międzyrzec Podlaski
Międzyrzec Podlaski
1831 in Poland
August 1831 events